Stiphodon allen, or Allen's stiphodon, is a species of goby known only from Queensland, Australia.
  
This species can reach a length of  SL.

References

allen
Taxa named by Ronald E. Watson
Fish described in 1996
Fish of Australia
Endemic fauna of Australia